The county of Hertfordshire in England is divided into eleven parliamentary constituencies. Each of the eleven elects a Member of Parliament (MP) to represent it at the United Kingdom (UK) Parliament in Westminster. As of the 2019 general election, ten of Hertfordshire's eleven MPs are Conservatives. The county currently has two urban borough constituencies (BC) – Broxbourne and Watford – while the other nine are classed as more rural county constituencies (CC).

Constituencies

Limits of the seats were amended by the Fifth Periodic Review of Westminster constituencies carried out by the Boundary Commission for England for future elections which have included 2010, 2015, 2017 and 2019. Each constituency is made up of whole or partial local government wards, which elect councillors at English local elections. Nine are designated as county constituencies (in which candidates can spend more per head than their borough counterparts). Two are borough constituencies.

2010 boundary changes 
The Boundary Commission for England decided not to change Hertfordshire's representation in Parliament for the 2010 election. It did however suggest slight boundary changes to reduce electoral disparity. The recommendations, which became law with the Parliamentary Constituencies (England) Order 2007, also ensured that local government wards in Hertfordshire would no longer be split between two Parliamentary constituencies.

Proposed boundary changes 
See 2023 Periodic Review of Westminster constituencies for further details.

Following the abandonment of the Sixth Periodic Review (the 2018 review), the Boundary Commission for England formally launched the 2023 Review on 5 January 2021. Initial proposals were published on 8 June 2021 and, following two periods of public consultation, revised proposals were published on 8 November 2022. Final proposals will be published by 1 July 2023.

The commission has proposed that Hertfordshire be combined with Bedfordshire as a sub-region of the Eastern Region, with the creation of the cross-county boundary constituency of Hitchin. As a result of the changes, Hitchin and Harpenden, would be abolished, and replaced by a new constituency named Harpenden and Berkhamsted. The following seats are proposed:

Containing electoral wards in Broxbourne

 Broxbourne (part)

Containing electoral wards in Dacorum

 Harpenden and Berkhamsted (part)
 Hemel Hempstead
 South West Hertfordshire (part)

Containing electoral wards in East Hertfordshire

 Broxbourne (part)
 Hertford and Stortford
 North East Hertfordshire (part)
 Stevenage (part)

Containing electoral wards in Hertsmere

 Hertsmere (part)
 Watford (part)

Containing electoral wards in North Hertfordshire

 Hitchin (part also in Central Bedfordshire)
 North East Hertfordshire (part)
 Stevenage (part)

Containing electoral wards in St Albans

 Harpenden and Berkhamsted (part)
 St Albans

Containing electoral wards in Stevenage

 Stevenage (part)

Containing electoral wards in Three Rivers

 South West Hertfordshire (part)

Containing electoral wards in Watford

 Watford (part)

Containing electoral wards in Welwyn Hatfield

 Hertsmere (part)
 Welwyn Hatfield

Results history
Primary data source: House of Commons research briefing - General election results from 1918 to 2019

2019 
The number of votes cast for each political party who fielded candidates in constituencies comprising Hertfordshire in the 2019 general election were as follows:

Percentage votes 

11974 & 1979 - Liberal Party; 1983 & 1987 - SDP-Liberal Alliance

* Included in Other

Seats 

11974 & 1979 - Liberal Party; 1983 & 1987 - SDP-Liberal Alliance

Maps

1885-1910

1918-1945

1950-1970

1974-present

Timeline

Historical representation by party 
A cell marked → (with a different colour background to the preceding cell) indicates that the previous MP continued to sit under a new party name.

1885 to 1918

1918 to 1955

1955 to present

See also
List of parliamentary constituencies in the East of England (region)
History of parliamentary constituencies and boundaries in Hertfordshire
East of England (European Parliament constituency)
Hertfordshire County Council
Hertfordshire local elections

Footnotes

References

General

Specific

Hertfordshire
 
Hertfordshire